Arayat, officially the Municipality of Arayat, is a 1st class municipality in the province of Pampanga in the Philippines. According to the 2020 census, it has a population of 144,875 people.

Geography
Arayat is bordered with Candaba, Mexico, Magalang, Santa Ana and Cabiao in Nueva Ecija. A large portion of Mount Arayat is located within this municipality.

Barangays
Arayat is politically subdivided into 30 barangays.

Climate

Demographics

Economy

Education
Schools

Gallery

References

External links

Arayat Profile at PhilAtlas.com
[ Philippine Standard Geographic Code]
Philippine Census Information
Local Governance Performance Management System

Municipalities of Pampanga
Populated places on the Pampanga River